Since the 1950s there has been discussion about the potential for the creation of a college football super league (also referred to as a National College Football Conference) which would feature college football teams from around the country regardless of conference. The formation of such a conference could require a group of school's to break from the NCAA Division I Football Bowl Subdivision to form the conference as an unsanctioned completion.

History

Tom Hamilton Proposed League 
In 1950's then Pittsburgh athletic Tom Hamilton proposed that USC, UCLA, Stanford, California and Washington should be part of a same conference with Army, Navy, Notre Dame, Pittsburgh, Syracuse, Penn State and Air Force to create an airplane league. Discussions for the Conference did not get off the ground.

2021 
In 2021 following the announcement of The Super League there was increased discussion of the potential of a College Football Super League. ESPN said such a Conference could generate more revenues especially from TV revenues since all the best teams would be in the league. Sporting News listed Alabama, Ohio State, LSU, Clemson, Georgia, Oklahoma, Notre Dame, Texas, Florida, Michigan, Florida State, Auburn, Miami, Penn State, and USC as 15 teams that would make the cut for a 15 team College Football Super League should one be formed. Based on four criteria, Revenue, championships, overall team record, and players from the teams being drafted into the NFL. The Associated Press noted however that the chances of a College Football Super Conference being formed is currently slim. Though they also stated that a restructuring of Division I and a change to how schools align their sports programs was probably a good idea. Chris Bevilacqua, CEO of SimpleBet  also stated that he didn't think a College Football Super League would be possible to achieve. A rough Nelson's estimate found that a 32 team college football super league could generate 2 and half times more television revenue for  bigger schools in the SEC and Big Ten then they currently receive, while Pac-12 and ACC schools could make five times more television revenue. The Atlanta Journal-Constitution argued that a College Football Super League could get a better reception then The Super League in association football since College Football don't have the expectation of sporting parity and games between bigger teams get larger audiences then between small teams and larger teams. The article also argued that a College Football Super League would also not require the approval of players since they are denied Labor rights. Thus the NCAA wouldn't have any leverage to prevent athletes from joining the Super League.

Criticism 
Griffin McVeigh said in Longhorn Wire that a College Football Super League would devalue non-conference games and would throw away "Traditions, pageantry, and decades of history" in the pursuit of greed. And that smaller schools left out of such a Super League would lose out on TV deals, exposure and recruiting prospects. Dan Woken in USA Today said a Super League ", would destroy the fabric of what college football is." and could face "severe backlash" if it was announced.

See also 
The Super League
Proposals for a European Super League in association football

References 

College football controversies
Proposed College sports conferences in the United States